Damat Gürcü Halil Rifat Pasha, (1795 – 3 March 1856) was an Ottoman admiral and statesman of Georgian origin.  He served in the periods of Mahmud II and Abdulmejid I.

Career
Halil Rifat Pasha was a slave, protégé and later rival of Koca Hüsrev Mehmed Pasha. He first served as the ambassador to Russia from 1829 to 1830. He then served as grand admiral for four times from 1830 to 1832, 1843–1845, 1847–1848 and 1854–1855, as well as chairman of the Supreme Council of Judicial Ordinances ("Meclis-i Vâlâ") from 1842 to 1845 and 1849–1850. He also served as serasker from 1836 to 1838 and 1839–1840. This placed him  in a good position to build and maintain a conservative group, usually in corporation with Hüsrev Pasha.

Family
Halil Rifat had three wives:
 (Fülane) Hanim. Unknown name wife by who he divorced to marry Saliha Sultan. From her he had at least one son:
 Ali Paşah, ambassador to Austria. He in turn had a son:
 Ali Füad Ürfi Bey. He married Ayşe Sidika Hanımsultan, daughter of Cemile Sultan, daughter of the sultan Abdülmejid I and granddaughter of sultan Mahmud II. By her he had two daughters:
Kerime Hanım
Naime Hanım 
  Saliha Sultan. Daughter of the sultan Mahmud II, they married on 22 May 1834 and he widowed in February 1843. Their marriage was unhappy, but by her he had two sons and a daughter:
 Sultanzade Abdülhamid Bey Efendi (2 March 1835 - March 1837).
 Sultanzade Cavid Bey Efendi (1837 -?).
 Ayşe Şıdıka Hanımsultan (1841 - 1886). She married Server Paşah, son of Said Server Efendi. She had at least three daughters:
 Ayşe Hanim.
 Azize Hanim. She married Hariciyeci Suad Bey and had two sons, Ziya Songülen and Mahmud Bey and a daughter Fehire Hanim.
 Fatma Hanim. She married Fehmi Bey, son of the grand vizier Mehmed Esad Saffet Pasha, and had a son, Halil Bey, and a daughter, Belkis Hanim.

After Saliha's death, he married:
 Ismet Hanim. From her he had a son:
  Asaf Mahmud Celaleddin Pasha (1853 - 1903). He had three wives:
 Hacer Hanim. From her he had a son:
 Halil Rifat Bey
 Iffet Hanim. By her he had two children:
 Ali Füad Bey
 Asım Bey
 Seniha Sultan, daughter of Sultan Abdülmejid I and granddaughter of Sultan Mahmud II. They married in February 1877 and had two children by her:
  Sultanzade Mehmed Sabahaddin (13 February 1879 – 30 June 1948). He had two wives and a daughter.
 Sultanzade Ahmed Lütfullah Bey. She had two wives, Kamran Hanim and a Hungarian woman, with whom he had a son, Nadi Bey.

Death
Hali Rifat Pasha died in Constantinople, Ottoman Empire (present day Istanbul, Turkey) on 3 March 1856.

See also
List of Kapudan Pashas

References

1795 births
1856 deaths
Kapudan Pashas
Georgians from the Ottoman Empire